Li Yuanyuan (born 3 October 1958) is a Chinese engineer who is an academician of the Chinese Academy of Engineering, former president of South China University of Technology, Jilin University and Huazhong University of Science and Technology, and currently party secretary of Huazhong University of Science and Technology.

He was a delegate to the 9th and 12th National People's Congress.

Biography 
Li was born in Mei County (now Meixian District of Meizhou), Guangdong, on 3 October 1958. In October 1973, he became a sent-down youth during the Down to the Countryside Movement. In 1978, he attended Hunan University, graduating in 1982 with a bachelor's degree in foundry science. He also received his master's degree in foundry science in 1987 and doctor's degree in machine manufacturing in 1998 at South China University of Technology.

After graduating in June 1982, he taught at his alma mater's Mechanical Department, and moved to South China University of Technology in June 1987, what he was promoted to associate professor in January 1992 and to full professor in December 1993. From February to May 1997, he was a visiting scholar at the Technical University of Berlin. In December 1998, he became vice president of South China University of Technology, rising to president in September 2003. He was president of Jilin University from September 2011 to October 2018, a position at vice-ministerial level. In May 2012, he was admitted to member of the standing committee of the Chinese Communist Party's Jilin Provincial Committee, the province's top authority. He took office as present of Huazhong University of Science and Technology in October 2018, and was promoted to CCP committee secretary, the top political position in the university, in October 2021.

Honours and awards 
 2013 Member of the Chinese Academy of Engineering (CAE)

References 

1958 births
Living people
People from Meizhou
Engineers from Guangdong
Hunan University alumni
South China University of Technology alumni
Academic staff of the South China University of Technology
Academic staff of Hunan University
Presidents of South China University of Technology
Presidents of Jilin University
Presidents of Huazhong University of Science and Technology
Members of the Chinese Academy of Engineering
Delegates to the 9th National People's Congress
Delegates to the 12th National People's Congress